Andrea Ódor (born 18 November 1975) is a Hungarian badminton player, born in Budapest. She competed in women's singles at the 1996 Summer Olympics in Atlanta.

References

External links

1975 births
Living people
Sportspeople from Budapest
Hungarian female badminton players
Olympic badminton players of Hungary
Badminton players at the 1996 Summer Olympics